John Patrick Stertzer (born October 4, 1990) is an American soccer player who plays as a midfielder.

Career

Real Salt Lake
After spending four seasons with the Maryland Terrapins Stertzer was selected as the twelfth overall pick in the 2013 MLS SuperDraft on January 17, 2013 by Real Salt Lake. Stertzer then made his official debut for Real Salt Lake in the MLS on March 9, 2013 against D.C. United at RFK Stadium in which he came on as a substitute for Khari Stephenson as Real Salt Lake lost the match 1–0. Stertzer was released by Salt Lake at the end of their 2016 season.

New York City FC
Sterzer signed with New York City FC on February 16, 2017. He was released by the club at the end of their 2017 season.

Career statistics

Club

References

External links 
 

1990 births
Living people
American soccer players
Maryland Terrapins men's soccer players
Real Salt Lake players
Real Monarchs players
New York City FC players
Association football midfielders
Sportspeople from Fairfax County, Virginia
Soccer players from Virginia
Real Salt Lake draft picks
Major League Soccer players
USL Championship players
People from Oakton, Virginia